Pah Wongso Tersangka (Indonesian for Pah Wongso Becomes a Suspect), also known under the Dutch title Pah Wongso Keert Terug (Pah Wongso Returns), is a 1941 film from the Dutch East Indies directed by Wu Tsun for Star Film. Saeroen's first work for the company, it is a sequel to the 1940 detective film Pah Wongso Pendekar Boediman, and stars the social worker L. V. Wijnhamer, Jr (better known as Pah Wongso) as a man who comes under suspicion and must clear his name. This possibly-lost film was styled as a comedy.

Premise
Pah Wongso has come under suspicion and must clear his name.

Production

Pah Wongso Tersangka was directed by Wu Tsun for the Batavia- (now Jakarta-) based Star Film, owned by Jo Eng Sek. The film was a sequel to Pah Wongso Pendekar Boediman, a detective film which was directed and produced by Jo Eng Sek, one of the owners of the Batavia (now Jakarta) based Star Film. The earlier film, a popular success, had been written to cash in on the popularity of the Hollywood characters Charlie Chan and Mr. Moto. It served as a vehicle for the Indo social worker L. V. Wijnhamer Jr., who was popular within the ethnic Chinese community for his social work, raising funds for the Red Cross to aid people in China and helping abandoned children.

This black-and-white film was shot by Chok Chin Hsien, who had also handled the cinematography for Pah Wongso Pendekar Boediman. The story was written by Saeroen, who was signed from Union Film for this production. Saeroen had risen to fame after writing the box office hit Terang Boelan (1939), and his works for Tan's Film and Union had likewise been successes. Production had begun by September 1941.

Wijnhamer returned from the Pah Wongso Pendekar Boediman, and took up four different characters. Three further actors returned from the original film: M Arief, Primo Oesman, and R Sukran. Further main cast members included Sylvia Hatjirah, S Waldy, and M Sarip. Of these, only Waldy, who had made his debut in 1940's Zoebaida for Oriental Film, had previous film experience. Other cast members included Ma' Njai and Oemar.

Pah Wongso Tersangka emphasised comedy, rather than the detective story of the original. In an editorial in Pertjatoeran Doenia dan Film, "S." wrote that such ventures into comedy – a genre which had not developed in the Indies – was important for the film industry as it would provide appropriate viewing material for children. He deemed that the success of the comedic works of Charlie Chaplin, Buster Keaton, and Laurel and Hardy provided ample evidence that the Indonesian market would support comedies, and expressed hope that the film – which also featured singing – would "leave audiences rolling with laughter".

Release
Pah Wongso Tersangka was screened by December 1941, and was reported to be well received. Also advertised under the Dutch title Pah Wongso Keert Terug (Pah Wongso Returns), it was rated for all ages. An advertisement in the Soerabaijasch Handelsblad promoted the film as "exciting", and emphasised the multiple roles taken by Wijnhamer. A novelisation of the film was published by the Yogyakarta based Kolff-Buning.

Legacy
As Pah Wongso Tersangka was screening in cinemas, Star was working on its next film, Ajah Berdosa, which was released in January 1942. This proved to be the company's last production; with the Japanese Empire's invasion of the Indies in March 1942, all studios – including Star – were closed. When the domestic industry was revived in 1948, Waldy was the only cast member to return to cinema; beginning with Air Mata Mengalir di Tjitarum (1949), he acted in over forty films before his death in 1968.

Pah Wongso Tersangka was screened as late as October 1947, but may now be lost. As elsewhere in the world, movies in the Indies then used highly flammable nitrate film, and after a fire destroyed much of Produksi Film Negara's warehouse in 1952, old films shot on nitrate were deliberately destroyed. As such, American visual anthropologist Karl G. Heider suggests that all Indonesian films from before 1950 are lost. However, Kristanto records several as having survived at Sinematek Indonesia's archives, and the film historian Misbach Yusa Biran writes that several Japanese propaganda films have survived at the Netherlands Government Information Service.

Explanatory notes

References

Works cited

 
 
 

Dutch East Indies films
Indonesian black-and-white films
Malay-language films